Isao Watanabe (born 23 November 1941) is a Japanese former professional tennis player.

Born in Tokyo, Watanabe competed on the international circuit in the 1960s, featuring in the main draws of the French Open and Wimbledon. He was Manuel Santana's first round opponent when the Spaniard won the 1966 Wimbledon Championships and took the opening set off him, before having to retire hurt while trailing in the second.

Watanabe was the men's singles champion at the 1967 University Games in Tokyo, defeating Jun Kamiwazumi for the gold medal. He also won a silver medal in the men's doubles event.

Between 1967 and 1970 he played Davis Cup tennis for Japan, mostly in doubles. In all seven of his doubles rubbers he partnered Koji Watanabe, who despite sharing the same name was not his brother. They won four of their doubles rubbers as a pairing. His only singles rubber was a win over Hong Kong's Kenneth Tsui in 1970.

See also
List of Japan Davis Cup team representatives

References

External links
 
 
 

1941 births
Living people
Japanese male tennis players
Universiade medalists in tennis
Universiade gold medalists for Japan
Universiade silver medalists for Japan
Sportspeople from Tokyo
20th-century Japanese people